Beitun District (lit: northern camp) is a district in Taichung, Taiwan. Located in the northern part of the city, it is a half mountainous, half urban area. Though Beitun District used to be considered part of the countryside, the new Taiyuan Station has urbanized it considerably. The highest point of Taichung City is located in Beitun, Douliu Hill (859 m).

History
The district used to be part of Taichung provincial city before the merger with Taichung County to form Taichung special municipality on 25 December 2010.

Administrative divisions
Beitun District is divided into 42 Li (里, or villages):

Education
 Central Taiwan University of Science and Technology
 Morrison Academy

Spots
 Taichung Intercontinental Baseball Stadium

Tourist attractions

 Beitun Wenchang Temple
 Dakeng hiking and biking trails
 Songzhu Temple
 Taichung Folklore Park
 Taichung Military Kindred Village Museum
 Yide Mansion

Transportation

Railway
 Songzhu railway station
 Taiyuan railway station

Taichung Metro
 Beitun Main metro station
 Jiushe metro station
 Songzhu station
 Sihwei Elementary School metro station
 Wenxin Chongde metro station

Roads
Provincial Highway No. 1A
Provincial Highway No. 3
Provincial Highway No. 74

Notable natives
 Dewi Chien, singer
 Joe Cheng, model, actor and singer

See also
 Taichung

References

External links

  

Districts of Taichung